The Gorman Brothers, Billy and Eddie Gorman, were a pair of vaudevillian entertainers and songwriters from Chicago, who performed across the United States and Canada from the early 1910s to the early 1930s. The Gormans expanded their act to radio, doing weekly broadcasts in the late 1920s. The brothers used local news stories to create songs for their act. During their show-business career, Billy and Eddie Gorman also contributed music and lyrics to several published and recorded songs.

Early life 

William Charles "Billy" Gorman was born on 31 March 1889. His younger brother Edward Aloysius "Eddie" Gorman was born 27 June 1892. They were the sons of William E. Gorman, an Irish immigrant who worked as a stationary engineer, and Mary E. (O'Halloran) Gorman, a piano salesperson, originally from Canada.

While still in the early stages of his entertainment career, Billy played ball for the Decatur Three-I League baseball team, the Commodores. He was the team's manager and shortstop. By the first half of 1913, his performance on the field had notably suffered, and after being replaced as the manager, he was sold to the Terre Haute club of the Central League in July of that year.   During his time there, he was praised as being "a fast and aggressive player". He finished one season with this club, and was traded to the Victoria BC club of the Northwest League. However, he refused to report to this club and was subsequently released from it.  By November 1914, he had given up the sport entirely to work in show business with his younger brother, Eddie, and their accompaniment pianist, J. Walter Leopold. 

Eddie had worked as a railroad clerk, and later as an "on the street" newspaper reporter for the Chicago Tribune, during his brother's baseball career. 

While the act started out on the road as The Gorman Brothers and Leopold, Leopold's name disappeared from the billings after January 1915, and from then on, the team was featured only as The Gorman Brothers.

Vaudeville 

The Gorman Brothers wrote all-original songs for their acts, often drawing from news events of the day that were relevant to the locations they played. A feature article on their work described how they would get up in the morning, go to the editorial room of the local newspaper, and, "As the news copy comes from the telegraph operators, the vaudevillians cast their respective eagle eyes over it and select five or six items for jingling purposes." Another source explained,"...the men subscribe to the local newspaper for about three weeks before they arrive at the town where they are scheduled to play. In this manner, they are able to word the news stories to fit their music."

Credited with such names as "the boys with a thousand songs", "the singing reporters", and "the kings of character singing", they entertained in many cities across the U.S. and Canada. They were rarely the headliners, but the entertainment sections of the newspapers frequently reviewed their performances. Below are a few examples:

Early in 1932, the Gorman Brothers' names stopped appearing in the newspapers. Vaudeville had met its end as an art form by then, with the introduction of talking movies, and the impact on the economy from the Great Depression. The brothers did not appear to have made a transition to the silver screen. and there is no known footage of them performing their acts.

Radio

In the late 1920s, the Gormans had taken their act to the airwaves, reaching a larger audience as "the singing reporters", in a weekly broadcast for the National Broadcasting Company. Their broadcasts reached fans in Springfield, Baltimore, Rochester, Pittsburgh, and Cincinnati.

Songwriting 

In addition to creating all-new songs for their act, the brothers are credited with a number of published and recorded musical works.  

These include:

"Why Don't They Dance the Good Old Dances of Ireland ?" (1912)- lyrics in the sheet music are credited to Eddie Gorman, yet a newspaper article attributes the song to his brother Billy 
"Sailing Thru The Panama Canal" (1914) - music by J. Walter Leopold  
"Anna in Indiana" (1921) - written with Harry Rose and F.E. Phares; recorded on Edison Blue Amberol cylinder in 1921 with vocalist Aileen Stanley
"All By Myself" (1921) - written with Aileen Stanley, Harry Rose, Arthur Fields; recorded on 78rpm disc in 1921 with Aileen Stanley, comedienne, and Irving Berlin's orchestra [side a] and Arthur Fields, tenor, with Irving Berlin's orchestra [side b]
"Mammy's Little Angel Chile" (1921) - written with Harry Rose
"Mareeta" (ca. 1921)
"When She Walks" (ca. 1921)
"Ain't We Got Ambition" (ca.1922)
"Atta Boy, Petey, Old Boy" (ca.1922)
"Revenge is Sweet" (ca.1922)
"That Was Before I Was Married" (ca.1922)
"I've Had Fifty-Seven Varieties (of Sweethearts)" (1922) - recorded on Edison disc in Nov 1922, featuring vocalist Billy Jones.     The Gorman Brothers had recorded themselves on a novelty version of this song, as a quartet, with Billy singing second tenor and Eddie singing first tenor, baritone, and bass (by making multiple-pass recordings as Eddie sang a new part to the old recording with each new pass). Billy carried around the one and only recording of this disc.
"When Greek Meets Greek" (1923) - written with Edward Furman, W. Nash, Harry Von Tilzer; recorded on 78rpm disc on 19 Oct 1923 with vocalists Furman and Nash
Eddie Cantor's Song and Joke Book. No. 1 (1930) - written with Eddie Cantor; includes parodies to "Singin' in the Rain", "Tip Toe Thru the Tulips", and "Sunny Side Up", with songs titled "Oh Yeah!", "I Found a 'Thru' street to Happiness", "Don't Go to the Poor-House Mother", and "When I Waltz With You"
"Waltzing" (1930)

Later life 

Eddie and Billy (together with Billy's wife Josephine and their children Elaine, Dolores, and William) lived with their mother, Mary, in Chicago up through the 1940s. Mary died on 17 July 1945 (her husband William had died many years earlier, on 25 Oct 1914).    According to the occupation section in the 1940 census, the brothers had continued their show-business careers as night club entertainers. 

Billy, a long-time golf professional, became the owner of Gorman's Golf Practice Range (established Aug 1938) in Cicero, IL, and simultaneously held a position as a golf pro at Golfmoor Golf club in nearby Oaklawn, IL. In 1939, he appeared in a newspaper ad for Meister Brau beer, where he was shown giving golf lessons to onlookers. His 1942 draft registration card still listed his place of employment as Golfmoor. 

Eddie, who had not married, died on 17 May 1957 at the age of 64. Billy passed away a few years later on 8 Nov 1961 at age 72. Both are buried in Hillsdale, Illinois.

References

People from Chicago
Vaudeville performers
Brothers